Joep Lankhaar (born 12 September 1966 in Alphen aan den Rijn) is a Dutch former footballer.

Club career
Lankhaar played for FC Den Haag, who signed him from amateur club ARC, and Dordrecht'90 in the Netherlands as well as Racing Mechelen and Lierse in Belgium.

International career
He made one appearance for the Netherlands national football team in the UEFA Euro 1988 qualifying campaign in a 3-0 win over Greece on 16 December 1987 in Rhodes.

References

External links
 
 

1966 births
Living people
Dutch footballers
Dutch football managers
Netherlands international footballers
Dutch expatriate footballers
Dutch expatriate sportspeople in Belgium
Expatriate footballers in Belgium
Eredivisie players
Eerste Divisie players
Belgian Pro League players
K.R.C. Mechelen players
FC Dordrecht players
ADO Den Haag players
Lierse S.K. players
Footballers from Alphen aan den Rijn
Association football defenders
SV ARC players